Tripura People's Front (TPF) was a regional party  in Tripura, India. It celebrated its third foundation day in July 2017. On 20 March 2022, it merged with the Bharatiya Janata Party.

TPF was active in tribal areas.

References 

Political parties in Tripura
Indigenous People's Front of Tripura
Political parties established in 2014
2014 establishments in Tripura